Masks and Faces is the debut album by the New Klezmer Trio, Ben Goldberg - clarinet, Dan Seamans - bass, and Kenny Wollesen - drums, which was originally released on the Nine Winds label in 1991 and re-released on the Tzadik label in 1996.

Reception

In her review for Allmusic, Joslyn Layne observed "this raucous, bursting, and somewhat disjointed music sustains a groove that's not so hard to hang on to. Almost an hour in length, New Klezmer Trio's first release ebbs and flows, relentlessly packed with high quality tunes".

Track listing
All compositions by Ben Goldberg except as indicated
 "Cardboard Factory" - 5:06   
 "Hot and Cold" (Traditional) - 3:44   
 "Rebbe's Meal" (Traditional) - 7:36   
 "Up" (Dan Seamans) - 4:19   
 "Washing Machine Song" (Traditional) - 2:59   
 "Galicain" (Sam Beckerman) - 5:18   
 "Masks and Faces" - 6:33   
 "Haphazard" (Itzikl Kramtweiss) - 4:03   
 "Bitonal Song" (Kramtweiss) - 3:06   
 "The Gate" - 10:33

Personnel
Ben Goldberg - clarinet, bass clarinet
Dan Seamans - bass
Kenny Wollesen - drums

References 

Tzadik Records albums
Ben Goldberg albums
1991 albums